The Pantanal is a tropical wetland area in Brazil, Bolivia and Paraguay.

Pantanal may also refer to:
 Arena Pantanal, a football stadium in Brazil
 Pantanal cat, a species of wild cat
 Pantanal (TV series), a 1990 Brazilian telenovela
 Pantanal (2022 TV series), a 2022 Brazilian telenovela
 Pantanal Futebol Clube, a Brazilian football team
 Pantanal Linhas Aéreas, a Brazilian airline
 Pantanal do Rio Negro State Park, state park in Brazil.
 Pantanal Matogrossense National Park, national park in Brazil.